The Unity Party (in French, Parti unité) was a political party in Quebec, Canada.

The party was formed as a reaction to then-Premier Robert Bourassa invoking the notwithstanding clause of the Canadian constitution to override a Supreme Court ruling overturning parts of the Charter of the French Language (commonly known as "Bill 101").

The party platform called for equality of both languages (French and English) in Quebec, opposing Bill 101 which made French the sole official language of Quebec and imposed restrictions on the use of English on public signs.  The Unity Party drew virtually all of its support from elements of Quebec's anglophone minority, and only ran candidates in electoral districts with very high anglophone populations outside the Montreal Island, while its twin party, the Equality Party, ran candidates exclusively on the Montreal Island. The Equality Party won four seats in the National Assembly in the 1989 general election.

The Unity Party merged with the Equality Party on September 1990.

Election results

See also

 Politics of Quebec
 List of Quebec general elections
 List of Quebec premiers
 List of Quebec leaders of the Opposition
 National Assembly of Quebec
 Timeline of Quebec history
 Political parties in Quebec

External links
 National Assembly historical information
 La Politique québécoise sur le Web

Provincial political parties in Quebec
Quebec Anglophone culture